USCGC Anthony Petit (WLM-558) is a Keeper-class coastal buoy tender of the United States Coast Guard.  Launched in 1999, she has served her entire career maintaining navigational aids in Southeast Alaska.

Construction 
Anthony Petit was built by Marinette Marine Corporation in Marinette, Wisconsin.  She was the eighth of the fourteen Keeper-class vessels completed.  The contract price for the entire class was $220 million, suggesting that the original cost of Anthony Petit was approximately $15.7 million.  The ship was launched on January 30, 1999, into the Menominee River.  Speakers at the christening ceremony included Alaska Senator Frank Murkowski, and Coast Guard Commandant Admiral James Loy.

The hull is built of welded steel plate.

Keeper-class ships, including Anthony Petit, use z-drives for propulsion instead of fixed propellers and rudders.   The z-drives may be synchronized to point in the same direction when underway.  The ship is steered by changing the direction of the thrust.  For fine maneuvering or station keeping while working on a buoy, the two z-drives may be pointed in different directions.  These are combined with a bow thruster to allow the ship to remain at the same spot in the sea, a capability known as dynamic positioning. The two z-drives are powered by two Caterpillar 3508 TA Diesel engines.

Electrical power is provided by three Caterpillar 3406 generators.

The ship has a 42-foot long boom crane capable of lifting 10 tons onto her buoy deck.  This allows floating buoys to be hoisted aboard for maintenance.  The buoy deck is 1,335 square feet in area.

Anthony Petit, as all Keeper-class buoy tenders, has an ice-strengthened hull so that she may continue to service navigational aids in light ice conditions. There is an "ice-belt" of thicker steel at the ship's waterline to resist ice damage to the hull. The bow is shaped to ride up over the ice and crush it with the ship's weight. Her performance in ice conditions varies with the quality of the ice, the amount of power applied, and other factors.

This boat was estimated to cost $210,000.

The ship's namesake is U.S. Coast Guard Chief Boatswain's Mate Anthony Petit, the keeper of the Scotch Cap lighthouse on the west end of Unimak Island in the Aleutians. Petit and four other members of his crew were killed in a tsunami which destroyed the lighthouse on April 1, 1946.

Operational history 

After her launch and sea trials, Anthony Petit sailed down the Great Lakes, the Saint Lawrence Seaway, and through the Panama Canal to reach Ketchikan, Alaska, her homeport for her entire career.    She arrived in January 2000.  The ship is stationed at Coast Guard Base Ketchikan.  She replaced USCGC Planetree at this station.  Her primary mission is maintaining 274 fixed and floating aids to navigation in Southeast Alaska.

The ship has also performed other Coast Guard missions.  Anthony Petit participated in search and rescue activities as with the charter boat Fishin' Fool in 2002, fishing vessel Yvonne Denise in 2005, the ferry Lituya in 2009, and the fishing vessel Tsimshian Lady in 2017.

Anthony Petit has trained extensively on oil spill containment.  She has participated in several joint United States-Canada exercises to prepare for a possible spill in the Dixon Entrance area.  She has deployed the vessel of opportunity skimming system (VOSS) several times in training.

References 

Ships of the United States Coast Guard
1999 ships
Ships built by Marinette Marine
Keeper-class cutters